Jack Hargreaves was an English television presenter and writer.

Other people with this name include:

 Jack Hargreaves (golfer), English golfer
 Jack Hargreaves (rower), Australian rower